Zeta Horologii, Latinized from ζ Horologii, is a yellow-white-hued binary star system in the southern constellation of Horologium. It is visible to the naked eye with a combined apparent visual magnitude of 5.20. Based upon an annual parallax shift of 20.37 mas as seen from Earth, it is located around 160 light-years from the Sun.

This system was determined to be a double-lined spectroscopic binary by J. H. Moore in 1911−12. The first orbital elements were published by J. Sahade and C. A. Hernández in 1964, who found it consisted of two F-type main-sequence stars of probable stellar classifications F2 V and F5 V. The pair orbit each other with a period of 12.9274 days and an eccentricity of 0.25. This suggests a circumbinary debris disk orbiting at a distance of less than 4.8 AU from the star system.

References

F-type main-sequence stars
Circumstellar disks
Spectroscopic binaries
Horologium (constellation)
Horologii, Zeta
Durchmusterung objects
016920
012484
0802